Mikayıllı or Mikailly or Mikeyly may refer to:
Mikayıllı, Jalilabad, Azerbaijan
Mikayıllı, Neftchala, Azerbaijan